The armigerous river snail or armored rocksnail, scientific name Lithasia armigera, is a species of freshwater snail with an operculum, an aquatic gastropod mollusk in the family Pleuroceridae. This species is endemic to the United States.

References

Pleuroceridae
Gastropods described in 1821
Taxonomy articles created by Polbot